Sir Robert Worsley, 3rd Baronet Worsley (1643–1675, Appuldurcombe) was an English politician who sat in the House of Commons of England during the Cavalier Parliament, representing Newtown on the Isle of Wight from 1666 to 1675. He was counted as a member of the Court party, but was not considered very active in parliament.

Family
He was the son of Sir Henry Worsley (1612–1666), the second Baronet, and Bridget, daughter of Sir Henry Wallop. He married, in 1668, Mary Herbert (died 1693), daughter of the Hon. James Herbert of Kingsey in Buckinghamshire, second surviving son of Philip Herbert, 4th Earl of Pembroke and Montgomery (1584–1650) and his wife Susan de Vere (1587–1629), youngest daughter of Edward de Vere, 17th Earl of Oxford, and thus a descendant of Sir Philip Sidney.

Mary later married, as his second wife, Edward Noel, 1st Earl of Gainsborough.

He was succeeded by his eldest son, Robert. His second son Henry became an army officer, MP and Governor of Barbados. His daughter Jane married Sir Nathaniel Napier, 3rd Baronet, but died without issue.

Life
Worsley was knighted at Whitehall on 29 December 1664 and succeeded to the baronetcy 11 September 1666. He was elected member of parliament for Newtown in November 1666, and served until his death. He was seated at Apuldercombe (or now Appuldurcombe), on the Isle of Wight, where his family had come into the possession of a large Tudor mansion (later replaced by the grand eighteenth century Appuldurcombe House).

References

1643 births
1675 deaths
Baronets in the Baronetage of England
English MPs 1661–1679
Robert Worsley, 3rd Baronet